Samuel Thornton Durrance (Ph.D.) (born September 17, 1943) is an American scientist who flew aboard two NASA Space Shuttle missions as a payload specialist.

Background
Durrance was born September 17, 1943, in Tallahassee, Florida, but grew up in Tampa, Florida. He attended Wilson Junior High and graduated from Plant High School in 1961, lettering in American football for three years and playing both of defense and offense, He received a Bachelor of Science degree and a Master of Science degree in physics (with honors), at California State University, Los Angeles (Cal State LA), 1972 and 1974, respectively, and a Doctor of Philosophy degree in astro-geophysics at the University of Colorado at Boulder, 1980. In 2000, he was awarded a Honorary Doctor of Science from the University of Colorado at Boulder along with eight other astronaut alums.

Durrance was a Principal Research Scientist in the Department of Physics and Astronomy at Johns Hopkins University, Baltimore, Maryland. He was a co-investigator for the Hopkins Ultraviolet Telescope, one of the instruments of the Astro Observatory.

Starting in 2000, he was the executive director of the Florida Space Research Institute which was located at the NASA Kennedy Space Center.

He now resides in Melbourne, Florida and is a professor of Physics and Space Sciences at Florida Institute of Technology.

He is a member of the American Astronomical Society, American Geophysical Union, International Astronomical Union, Association of Space Explorers, Planetary Society, and Phi Kappa Phi.

Academic career

Durrance has been involved in the flight hardware development, optical and mechanical design, construction, and integration of the Hopkins Ultraviolet Telescope and the Astro Observatory. He has conducted research and directed graduate students at the Johns Hopkins University for the past 15 years. He has designed and built spectrometers, detectors, and imaging systems, and made numerous spacecraft and ground-based astronomical observations. He conceived and directed a program at Johns Hopkins University to develop adaptive-optics instrumentation for ground based astronomy. He led the team that designed and constructed the Adaptive Optics Coronagraph, which led to the discovery of the first cool brown dwarf orbiting a nearby star. He also a co-discoverer of changes in the planet-forming disk surrounding the star beta Pictoris.

His research interests include the origin and evolution of the Solar System, the search for planets around other stars, planetary astronomy, atmospheric physics, nuclear physics, adaptive optics, spacecraft operations, and the origin of life. He has published over 60 technical papers in professional journals covering these topics.

In March of 1986, Durrance's first mission was for STS-61-E, It was canceled after the Challenger disaster. Durrance logged over 615 hours in space as a payload specialist and member of the crew of Space Shuttle Columbia for the STS-35/Astro-1 and Space Shuttle Endeavour for the STS-67/Astro-2 missions.

Current Assignment (2006)

Durrance is currently employed by the Florida Institute of Technology in Melbourne, Florida, serving as a professor in the Department of Aerospace, Physics and Space Sciences.

References

External links

 
Spacefacts biography of Samuel T. Durrance
Florida Tech Physics and Space Science Department Faculty

1943 births
Living people
American astronauts
21st-century American physicists
American astronomers
American science writers
People from Tampa, Florida
California State University, Los Angeles alumni
University of Colorado Boulder alumni
NASA sponsored astronauts
Johns Hopkins University faculty
Florida Institute of Technology faculty
Space Shuttle program astronauts